Engelbert Smutny (19 March 1917 – 31 October 1972) was an Austrian footballer and manager. He played in three matches for the Austria national football team in 1946.

References

External links
 

1917 births
1972 deaths
Austrian footballers
Austria international footballers
Place of birth missing
Association footballers not categorized by position
Austrian football managers
Grazer AK managers